In mathematics, Lindelöf's theorem is a result in complex analysis named after the Finnish mathematician Ernst Leonard Lindelöf. It states that a holomorphic function on a half-strip in the complex plane that is bounded on the boundary of the strip and does not grow "too fast" in the unbounded direction of the strip must remain bounded on the whole strip. The result is useful in the study of the Riemann zeta function, and is a special case of the Phragmén–Lindelöf principle. Also, see Hadamard three-lines theorem.

Statement of the theorem
Let Ω be a half-strip in the complex plane:

Suppose that ƒ is holomorphic (i.e. analytic) on Ω and that there are constants M, A and B such that

and

Then f is bounded by M on all of Ω:

Proof
Fix a point   inside . Choose , an integer  and  large enough such that
. Applying maximum modulus principle to the function  and
the rectangular area  we obtain , that is, . Letting  yields 
 as required.

References

Theorems in complex analysis